Leptoancistrus cordobensis is a species of catfish in the family Loricariidae. It is native to South America, where it occurs in the upper Sinú River basin as well as the upper San Jorge River basin in the Magdalena River drainage in Colombia. The species reaches 3.7 cm (1.5 inches) in standard length.

References 

Fish described in 1964
Loricariidae